Masters W45 marathon world record progression is the progression of world record improvements of the marathon W45 division of Masters athletics.  Records must be set in properly conducted, official competitions under the standing IAAF rules unless modified by World Masters Athletics.  

The W45 division consists of female athletes who have reached the age of 45 but have not yet reached the age of 50, so exactly from their 45th birthday to the day before their 50th birthday.  Marathon running is not normally seeded into age divisions so all of these records were set in marathon race open to most other age groups.

Progression
Key

See also
List of world records in masters athletics - Marathon Women

References

External links
Masters Athletics Marathon list

Masters athletics world record progressions
Marathon world records